Eric Fransiscus Charles Niehe (born 4 November 1943) is a retired Dutch rower who won a bronze medal in the coxless fours at the 1966 World Rowing Championships. He competed at the 1968 Summer Olympics in the eight event and finished in eights place.

His younger brother Ivo is a television presenter, producer and actor.

References

1943 births
Living people
Dutch male rowers
Olympic rowers of the Netherlands
Rowers at the 1968 Summer Olympics
Rowers from Amsterdam
World Rowing Championships medalists for the Netherlands
20th-century Dutch people
21st-century Dutch people